Achadas da Cruz is a civil parish in the municipality of Porto Moniz in the Portuguese island of Madeira.The population in 2011 was 159, in an area of 7.88 km2. It is situated on the north-western coast of the island. No children have been born in the parish between 2001 and 2009.

Society

Between 1835 And 1840 this parish has registered 18 marriages. The first registered marriage in this parish was On the year of 1827. From 1860 and 1911 this parish has witnessed  824 baptisms happening there. In between 1910 and 1911, there were associated to this parish 14 deaths, 4 of which were from people  who died  at that time with an age above 18 years old.

Architecture
 Chapel of Nossa Senhora do Livramento

References

Freguesias of Porto Moniz